Gastrotheca griswoldi is a species of frog in the family Hemiphractidae. The species is endemic to central Peru.

Geographic range
G. griswoldi is known from the Huánuco, Junín, and Pasco Regions of Peru.

Etymology
The specific name, griswoldi, honours John Augustus Griswold Jr (1912–1991), an American aviculturist and ornithologist.

Common names
The "common name", Griswold's marsupial frog, has been coined for G. griswoldi.

Habitat
The natural habitats of G. griswoldi are dry puna grasslands, including traditionally cultivated arable land, at elevations of  asl.

Conservation status
G. griswoldi is a relatively abundant species that does not appear to face major threats.

References

Further reading
Shreve B (1941). "Notes on Ecuadorian and Peruvian Reptiles and Amphibians with Descriptions of New Forms". Proc. New England Zool. Club 18: 71–84. (Gastrotheca boliviana griswoldi, new subspecies, p. 83).

griswoldi
Frogs of South America
Amphibians of the Andes
Amphibians of Peru
Endemic fauna of Peru
Taxa named by Benjamin Shreve
Amphibians described in 1941
Taxonomy articles created by Polbot